Tank Battalion "Kune" (lit. "Martens") (Croatian: Tenkovska bojna "Kune") is one to two armoured units within the Guards Armoured Mechanized Brigade (GOMBR) of the Croatian Army.

History 
Established in its current form after the reorganisation of the Croatian Armed Forces in 2007, the Tank Battalion bears the name of Kune (Martens), inheriting it from the wartime 3rd Guards Brigade "Kune", a Croatian Army brigade.

Organisation 
Garrisoned at 3rd Guards Brigade "Kune" Barracks in Đakovo Eastern Croatia, the tank battalion is composed of three tank companies of M-84 main battle tanks, a command company, an anti-armour platoon of wheeled POLO M-83, a reconnaissance platoon, a signals platoon and a logistics company.

Operations 
In the past, members of the tank battalion have deployed members in support of the NATO ISAF mission in Afghanistan as part of the Croatian Contingent (HRVCON), United Nations Interim Force in Lebanon (UNIFIL) and other UN and NATO peacekeeping operations.

References 

Military units and formations of Croatia